The Stowe Reporter is a newspaper based in the US state of Vermont that is published once a week on Thursdays and has a circulation of 5,000. It serves greater the Mt. Mansfield area, including Stowe, Waterbury, Morrisville, Hyde Park, and across Lamoille County, Vermont. Gregory Popa is the paper's publisher.

History 
The Stowe Reporter was founded in 1958 by Dorre Hanna and Martha Ball. 

It was purchased by Trow Elliman, Alex Nimick, Russ Spring, and Mary and Bob Bourdon two years later, in 1960. Elliman bought out his partners in 1965. He remained  publisher of the paper until 1998. 

In May  1998 the paper was bought by A.B. "Biddle" Duke. Duke was the son of Angier Biddle Duke and Robin Chandler Duke.  In 2007, Duke spun off another paper, the Waterbury Record. Duke stepped down as publisher in 2014.

In 2015, Duke sold his majority share in the paper to Bob Miller and Greg Popa became publisher of the paper.

Since 2015, the Stowe Reporter has added more local newspapers to its group, including the Shelburne News, The Citizen, serving Hinesburg and Charlotte, South Burlington's The Other Paper, and the News & Citizen of Morrisville. 

In January 2019, the company changed its name to the Vermont Community Newspaper Group.

Awards

New England Better Newspaper Competition - New England Newspaper and Press Association

Vermont Press Association

Vermont Ski & Snowboard Museum

References 

Newspapers published in Vermont
Publications established in 1958
1958 establishments in Vermont
Weekly newspapers published in the United States
Stowe, Vermont